Dorothy of Oz (도로시, Dorosi) is a  Japanese style manhwa by Son Hee-joon (손희준) originally published by Haksanpub and translated into English by UDON. The series contains five volumes to date; the first four of which have been translated into English.

The story is about an ordinary girl named Mara Shin who winds up in a science-fantasy realm called "Oz". During her journey to return to her world, she meets up with Abee (Scarecrow), Namu (Tin Woodsman), and Tail (Cowardly Lion), and follows a mysterious Yellow Brick Road that may hold the key to the path home.

Characters

Mara Shin 
Codename: Dorothy. Once an ordinary schoolgirl from Seoul, Korea, Mara is the only person able to see the strange “yellow brick road”, and as such, is often mistaken for the legendary “Dorothy” by the majority of Oz's occupants.  Despite the assumption by many that she is, indeed, Dorothy, Mara often reacts loudly and protestingly to being called as such, shouting, “My name is Mara...Mara Shin!” By stomping her boots (given to her by Selluriah, the Witch of the East), she can turn into a witch.  She is the owner of both the witch's boots (obviously the manhwa's version of the ruby slippers) and Thyrsos, a magical glove that when summoned turns into a staff. Thyrsos was previously owned by the Wizard of Oz. Although she lacks the knowledge and experience to use it correctly, when enraged it has been shown that she is capable of mass destruction.  It is worth noting that whenever Mara uses the Yellow Brick Road, it is irrelevant where it is positioned: it might go right through a wall and she can cross it as long as she is walking on it, but any pursuer will be unable to find her.  The only evidence are footprints left behind by Mara herself.  Mara seems unable to remember Thyrsos’ name, as she frequently refers to it as “Tomato Sauce”, only to be corrected by Selluriah, but later on starts correcting herself.  She has a huge crush 120% on Abee, praising his smile and kind, gentle qualities while once being intoxicated, although Abee had no clue what she meant by any of it. She seems to have a tendency to forget Toto and later running back to find him.  Funnily enough, being drunk seems to amplify her power in Witch mode, or at least give her better direction.  Before drinking the Dwarfs' beer, she was almost incapable of performing magic, but after getting drunk, she wielded both fire and electricity spells with such frightening ability that Tick Tock began to consider her a new and serious threat to the South.  Despite her rather impressive temper, Mara seems to dislike fighting, although is initially very eager to learn to use magic.

Toto 
Toto is a small creamy-yellow colored dog and Mara's constant companion and pet.  He was responsible for Mara's coming to Oz, as he stole her “lucky” glove and ran down the yellow brick road (which was situated in a seemingly normal alleyway in Mara's hometown), causing her to follow him in an attempt to get both him and her glove back.  Unfortunately, after doing so, she could not find the way back home, and she and Toto were taken in by Selluriah.  Toto has a habit of barking ferociously at any and all who annoy him, up to and including a dangerous “pig bear”, Tail, an assassin, Tick Tock, a flock of bats, and the Seven Dwarfs.

Abee 
Codename: Scarecrow (“Huhsuabee”). Abee is one of several clones created to be the Witch of the West's “secret weapon”.  Unlike the others, he is gentle and has a strange habit of mixing up his vocabulary, to be corrected by Mara, who seems to be the only one who can fully translate his mixed-up speech.  His special power is telekinesis, which makes him particularly dangerous in a fight when provoked into using it.  He met Mara when she came across him tied to a scarecrow (a reference to the original Scarecrow) and let him down after giving him some important grammar lessons.  He lost his memory shortly before being tied up, and was beaten for not giving information to the soldiers who tied him up (the only reason he was silent was because his loss of memory also caused him to forget how to speak), eventually telling Mara that she was the “only one who [was] nice to [him]”.  Abee was created by the Witch of the West and, unlike the other clones, he has a codename rather than a number.  He is seemingly very powerful, as he is capable of matching a very high ranking clone, Number 3, in split seconds.  Abee got his name from Mara, who merely shortened his codename's Korean lettering, “Huhsuabee”, down to the last four letters.  As of the fourth book in the series, he seems to have formed a slight rivalry with Namu.  Abee holds Mara in extremely high esteem, right down to losing his temper whenever she is threatened or attacked and promising to protect her from Namu, should said cyborg ever try to do anything to her.

Namu 
Codename: Tin Woodsman. Namu is a cyborg (essentially half human, half machine), and predictably is calm, quiet, logical, and virtually emotionless.  He has the ability to create holograms, as well as cause ax blades to come out of his wrists, making his already super-strong punches even more dangerous.  Namu has three distinct modes, Defense Mode, Control Mode, and Combat Mode, and is said to be the finest project ever produced by the South Lab.  Strangely for a robotic being, he has an aversion to killing, even protecting his own assaulter (Tick Tock) from a bullet.  He was originally sent to find Mara, but when she accidentally electrocuted him, he short circuited and lost a great deal of his memory and data.  After his fight with Tick Tock, Dr. Nedbar implanted a self-destruct program into him, as Namu feared his own Attack Mode and wanted to ensure he wouldn’t accidentally attack Mara should he regain his memory and find that his original mission was to eliminate her.  Despite the fact that they are enemies, Namu apparently cares for Tick Tock's well-being, going so far as to protect her from a bullet right after she tried to kill him and saved her from falling off a cliff before he even knew who she was.  Like Abee, he got his name from Mara, who gave him the Korean name for “wood” or “tree”.

Tail 
Codename: Cowardly Lion. Despite his codename, Tail is anything but cowardly, and even makes a comment about it when called a “Cowardly Lion” by Pillanin. He is a lion chimera, with the ears, tail, and claws of a lion.  Included with the package is super strength rivaling that of Namu.  Like the cat he is, he moves very fluidly and gracefully.  However, he is rather feminine in appearance, having long red hair and slanted eyes, causing confusion in many readers upon discovering that he is, indeed, a boy.  He is also constantly hungry, and tends to get angry and start shouting when contradicted or criticized.  He was first seen dashing through the woods near the South, wearing nothing but his black tank top and necklace, and apparently running for his life from some sort of giant rat creature.  Tail was created by the Witch of the North.

Lieutenant Pillanin 
Pillanin is a lieutenant in the Oz Military, but unfortunately has gone extremely bad.  He experimented not only on the people of Brick Village, but also on himself and his second-in-command Wolf (he turned himself into a vampire chimera, and Wolf into a wolf chimera).  He was able to cause trouble for Mara and her friends, but was ultimately no match for Shine, who arrived to take him into custody for his illegal experimenting.  His power increases by drinking blood.  Pillanin's fate is, as yet, unknown, last shown being carried off by Shine's men.

Special Agent Shine 
Shine, like Pillanin, is an officer in the Oz Military, albeit a much higher ranking one, with the title of “Special Agent” (“Secret Agent” in the chapter title).  Shine is relatively young but vastly experienced—he is said to be 1.35 times faster than Namu and was able to defeat Pillanin in his strongest form without even trying.  He wields a saber that, when struck, splits into several dart-like pieces that he somehow controls despite not having telekinesis.  Shine also seems to have his own agenda, as he blows up Brick Village for the sole purpose of driving Mara into a rage, and even states that “[he wants] to drive them crazy...and make them destroy Oz”.

Wolf 
Wolf is Pillanin's second-in-command and heavy muscle. As his name suggests, he is a wolf chimera.  Wolf was able to give Namu a fairly decent thrashing, but was himself thrashed by Tail, who knocked him out with one punch.  He and Tail were mainly adversaries, although because a wolf is a weaker creature than a lion, was no match for him in the end. His fate is unknown, although it is assumed he was killed in the explosion that destroyed Brick Village, as Shine ordered only Pillanin to be taken away. He was last seen losing all energy and reverting to his human form, as Pillanin used him as an outside energy source to make himself stronger.

Selluriah, the Witch of the East 
The Witch of the East, Selluriah was the original owner of the magical boots.  She appears young, but takes extreme pleasure in being called a “girl” by Mara and reacts violently to Indigo calling her old (Indigo later tells Mara that Selluriah's true age is classified information, and that she will kill him if he reveals it).  She also no longer considers herself a true witch because after she and the other witches attempted to fight the Wizard of Oz, she realized that the Wizard doesn't need any weapons to use magical powers (unlike her, who needed a medium or a weapon to fight with magical powers, which in her case are the magical boots). She saved Mara and Toto from a pig bear and was the first to recognize Mara as possibly being “Dorothy”, although she often forgets that Mara hates to be called as such.  She is the ruler of Sapphire City, and is in constant turmoil with Sepia, the leader of the Devil Tribe, who wants to take over her region.  However, Selluriah is not a true witch, as her power comes from her magical boots and she is virtually helpless without them.  Minutes after she gives the boots to Mara, she is killed by an assassin sent by the Witch of the West, who plunged a poisoned blade into her chest. Her last words were for Mara to flee Sapphire City and get to safety.  Out of all the witches, she seems to be the only one not completely ruthless, and before being killed, tells her assassin this.  Unlike Mara, Selluriah seemed to enjoy the stripping part of the witch's boots power. Selluriah is the only Witch who seemed to have not yet conducted any scientific experiments that involve human specimens (for she produces the Witch's boots, whereas Abee, Namu, and Tail, the products of the Witches of the West, South, and North respectively, were of human origin).

Sergeant Indigo 
Indigo is Selluriah's bodyguard and second-in-command of Sapphire City's military.  He is cheerful and dedicated, but worries constantly about Selluriah.  He, like Selluriah, has a “super suit” of sorts, and is known as “Superhuman Indigo” in that form.  He had an unfortunate habit of unintentionally catching Mara exposed in some way (such as walking in just as the magic boots took effect and seeing her fully naked), but is always very polite about it.  Upon failing in his duty to protect Selluriah, he causes an explosion that wipes out both himself and the assassins sent to kill him and his master, his last words being an apology to both Selluriah and Mara.  He and Selluriah appear to share a good friendship, and while he treats her respectfully and is very devoted to her, he also isn't afraid to tease her at times.  Usually, this ends in her stomping on him.

Sepia 
The leader of the Devil Tribe of Oz, and constantly in conflict with Selluriah.  His goal is to own Sapphire City and kill Selluriah, but she always defeats him with little to no effort.  It is unknown if he will attempt to take over Sapphire City again now that Selluriah is gone, but it is likely.  He is very excitable and hates being shown up, which, unfortunately, happens a lot.

The Witch of the West 
Not much is known of the Witch of the West yet, except that she, like Selluriah, is a scientist of incredible intelligence and caliber.  Her secret weapon is stated as being clones of her second-in-command (also unnamed as yet) that form her military.  Abee is one of these clones, but it is unknown if she even knows he has joined Mara or, indeed, even cares.  She is ruthless and seemingly cruel, and the one to send the assassins that killed Selluriah.  Also, like Selluriah, she is apparently much older than she looks, as Number 50 refers to her as “that old granny”.  It is also implied that, like Selluriah, she is rather touchy about her true age.

The West Witch's Assistant 
As yet unnamed; however, he is the one from whom all the clones were made.  His personality appears to reflect that of most of his clones, and he is apparently completely subservient to the Witch of the West.  Beyond that, nothing else is known.

Number 3 
One of several clones created by the Witch of the West.  Number 3 at first seems emotionless and cold, but reveals a cruel side when Abee points out that he basically said he had been looking for an excuse to kill Number 50.  With a smile, he admits that he slipped up and proclaims that Abee's accusation was indeed true.  He is extremely powerful, able to create force fields (known as “gravity spheres”), use telekinesis on two things at once, and manipulate living things with his powers, a feat which only the highest-ranking numbers can accomplish.  He is defeated by Abee in a battle of telekinesis, although this is probably due in part to the fact that he was absolutely shocked that Abee was as strong as he is.  He also displays the power to see through solid objects, referenced during his capture of Major Gayle.  Number 3 appears to be slightly older than the majority of the other clones, being taller and better filled out, with shoulder-length hair, and a colder, more intelligent demeanor.

Number 4 
One of several clones created by the Witch of the West, he is the one who killed Selluriah and is at least partially responsible for the death of Indigo.  Despite being an assassin, he has respect for the people he's sent after, as he tells one of the other clones, “Show some respect, he’s about to die!” when said other clone was taunting Indigo for being defeated by them.  Presumably, he is killed in the explosion Indigo causes as a last-ditch resort to take the clones down.

Number 50 / Mr.  Numb 
One of several clones created by the Witch of the West.  Number 50 is the leader of a team sent out to recover Abee.  He wears a ponytail and, unlike the other clones, is quite rebellious, having a personality unique to himself.  He despises Abee and most of the other clones for having his face and insists that people do not group him in with the rest.  He claims he is a natural-born leader.  When he failed his mission and was captured and tortured by Major Gayle, instead of dying like he should have (according to the West's military protocol), he killed the would-be assassin and turned rogue so far as to help Mara and Abee, but only because he needed their help in return.  He seems to be on friendly terms with Mara and Abee after they saved him and even adopts Mara's name for him: "Mr. Numb", proclaiming it proudly to the other clones when they arrive.  However, he is killed almost immediately afterwards by Number Three, who managed to survive Abee's attack.  He tells O’Neal during that battle that he, too, was once a swordsmanship instructor, and despised the job.  Number 50 plays an important part in the series, as it is he who teaches Abee to use his powers, telling him to “lift ‘em up...and put ‘em down”.

Major Gayle 
Major Gayle is yet another officer in the Oz Military, and is the head of the Rock Base in the East.  He is Selluriah's brother, although which is the older and which is the younger is unknown (it is assumed that Selluriah is the older).  He has two rings, one of which can shoot lightning and the other fire, given to him by his sister, and is also a master swordsman.  He seems prone to violent anger, as he tortures Number 50 for information about his sister's death.  Gayle is forced into being the new leader of the East after Selluriah's death by Number 3, who goes on to tell him that “this territory belongs to the West now”.

Dick and O’Neal 
Dick and O’Neal are Major Gayle's two best men, and the most skilled fighters in the Rock Base.  O’Neal tells Number 50 during their fight that he used to be a swordsmanship instructor, and that he hated it because the students were always causing trouble, and that he lost two stripes for it.  Dick is quiet and extremely strong, knocking Abee out with a single punch during their fight.  After they were defeated, Abee took O’Neal's vest, although never states why.  They were last seen buried under a pile of rocks, courtesy of Abee.

The Wizard of Oz 
Unlike the four Witches, the Wizard is a real magician and does not need magical items like they do to use his powers.  Ten years before the story begins, he was attacked by the four Witches when they discovered he had lost Thyrsos.  However he defeated Selluriah and the other three Witches alone; this incident would later cause Selluriah to denounce her title of “Witch”.  He was the original owner of Thyrsos, the magic staff, but it somehow wound up in the possession of Mara Shin, who has had it since she was a little girl, a byproduct of her first visit to Oz's strange land.

The Witch of the South 
Not much is known about her, except that she has short violet-indigo hair in a bob cut and slightly resembles Mara in appearance. She seems to be in constant conflict with Selluriah as well, as in the second book, one of the soldiers asks Mara, “Who sent you?  The Witch of the West?  The Witch of the South?” Also, in the third book, Major Gayle shouts at Number 50, “Why can’t you and the South just leave us alone?!” She is the one who created Namu and Tick Tock, and also Oz's first gun.  She apparently has somewhat of a temper, though nowhere near as bad as Selluriah.  She seems to not be very concerned with the realization that Namu has defected and joined Mara and Abee.

The South Witch's Assistant 
Also currently unnamed.  Dressed in a maid's outfit, she at first appears to be a regular servant.  However, she has shown to be very intelligent, figuring out right away that Tick Tock's memory had been tampered with and even guessing who might have done it.  Nothing else is known about her.

The Witch of the North 
Nothing is known yet about her or her personality, except that she has short, spiky dark hair, has a sword thrust through her belt, and her Witch form (or what appears to be it) includes long, sharp claws.  She created Tail, and may possibly have been on good terms with Selluriah.  Despite this, she was shown to have had a small fight with Selluriah in the second book.  She also seems to be the only one of the four Witches who doesn’t wear a pair of glasses.  Thus far, she has only been shown in shadow and silhouette.

Dr. Nedbar 
Dr. Nedbar is a former researcher from the South Lab, who stole the Witch of the South's latest project, Oz's first gun, and ran off with it, intending to sell it to the East in exchange for a new job and protection.  Tick Tock was sent to track him down, but with Mara, Abee, and Namu's help, he managed to escape.  He is apparently a mechanical expert (though nowhere near as good as the Witch of the South), as he was able to completely rewire Tick Tock's memory so that she would not remember finding them, and was also able to implant a self-destruct program into Namu.  Dr. Nedbar panics very easily, which tends to get him into more trouble than necessary.  For example, upon being found by Tick Tock, he resorts to pointing the gun at Mara, who Tick Tock intended to capture alive.  However, all this really accomplished was angering Abee, who took the gun and later threatened to throw him off the cliff for what he had done.  However, even though he had initially accepted the loss, he followed Abee and Namu into the caves for the sole purpose of reclaiming the gun.  Despite all the trouble he ended up causing, he turned out to be a very valuable ally both to Mara's group and to the Dwarfs, who he made several other androids for in exchange for shelter.  The gun remains in his possession, though what he plans to do with it now is not known.

Tick Tock 
Bearing the serial number SA-24, Tick Tock is the latest model of android to be created by the Witch of the South.  Her first mission was to capture and/or eliminate Dr. Nedbar, although thanks to Mara, Abee, and Namu, failed in this.  She is very strong and fast, but also a little clueless, failing to get a few analogies and is of the opinion that “being a human must suck”.  Like Namu, she is susceptible to electricity, which caused her to lose her memory and designate a young dwarf named Dopey as her master, although Dr. Nedbar later rewired her memory so that she would think she had accomplished her mission, killed Namu and Dr. Nedbar, and destroyed the gun, thus going back to the South Lab to report this false information.  Tick Tock is very vulnerable to sonic waves, such as those from a bat's screeches, as they cause her to shut down completely.  In the fourth book, she and Namu were stated to be a cute couple, although whether or not they will follow up on this is uncertain.

The Seven Star Dwarfs 
They are, obviously, seven dwarfs who live in the mountains near the South's territory and who happen to be friends of Dr. Nedbar. They tend to think of women as things; when bringing Mara and Tick Tock into their home, they set Mara the task of cooking and cleaning for them and attempted to take Tick Tock apart for scrap metal.  The youngest and nicest of their number is Dopey, who Tick Tock accidentally designated as her new master upon her reboot.  They are very protective of their beer and were thus very enraged with Mara when, to anger them, she drank a good portion of it.  They also love gold and jewels with a passion, making it their job to mine for them every day.  Even stranger, they have no fear whatsoever for the Witch of the South. Their names are Sneezy, Sleepy, Grumpy, Happy, Bashful, Doc, and Dopey, and are obviously (and somewhat oddly) named for the Seven Dwarfs in Snow White, which is a different fairy tale altogether.

Frog 
A little boy who apparently has the power to cause it to rain when he cries.  Mara comes across him after losing the Yellow Brick Road, right after fleeing from Sapphire City.  Upon talking to him, she finds out that the reason he is crying is because his mother is dead and he misses her.  Realizing that everyone needs a chance to cry for the people they love and miss, Mara joins him.  She forces him to stop, though, once the rain gets out of hand, and is shocked to discover that when his tears stop, so does the rain.  It turns out that Frog was actually a ghost, and had cried to wash the dirt away from the road to help Mara find it again.  The last that is seen of him is his gravestone, which is right next to his mother's.

References

External links
 UDON Dorothy of Oz website

Action-adventure comics
Fantasy comics
Haksan Culture Company titles